Lubomír Nádeníček (born 11 March 1947 in Brno) is a Czech former hurdler who competed in the 1968 Summer Olympics and in the 1972 Summer Olympics.

References

1947 births
Living people
Czech male hurdlers
Olympic athletes of Czechoslovakia
Athletes (track and field) at the 1968 Summer Olympics
Athletes (track and field) at the 1972 Summer Olympics
Sportspeople from Brno
European Athletics Championships medalists